The 2012 Ireland women's Tri-Series were two cricket tournaments that took place in Ireland in 2012: the Ireland women's ODI Tri-Series and the Ireland women's T20 Tri-Series. Ireland, Bangladesh and Pakistan competed in both tournaments, and they were both won by Pakistan. The series were part of Pakistan's tour of England and Ireland and Bangladesh's tour of Ireland.

Squads

ODI Tri-Series

Points table

Source: ESPN Cricinfo

Fixtures

1st ODI

2nd ODI

3rd ODI

T20 Tri-Series

Points table

Source: ESPN Cricinfo

Fixtures

1st T20I

2nd T20I

3rd T20I

See also
 Bangladeshi women's cricket team in Ireland in 2012
 Pakistani women's cricket team in England and Ireland in 2012

References

External links
Ireland Tri-Nation Women's One-Day Series 2012 from Cricinfo
Ireland Tri-Nation Women's T20 Series 2012 from Cricinfo

Pakistan women's national cricket team tours
Bangladesh women's national cricket team tours
Women's international cricket tours of Ireland
International cricket competitions in 2012
2012 in women's cricket
Women's Twenty20 cricket international competitions